A recycling bin (or recycle bin) is a container used to hold recyclables before they are taken to recycling centers. Recycling bins exist in various sizes for use inside and outside homes, offices, and large public facilities. Separate containers are often provided for paper, tin or aluminum cans, and glass or plastic bottles, or may be commingled.

Many recycling bins are designed to be easily recognizable, and are marked with slogans promoting recycling on a blue or green background along with the universal recycling symbol. Others are intentionally unobtrusive. Bins are sometimes in different colors so that the user may differentiate between the types of materials to be placed in them. While there is no universal standard, the color blue is commonly used to indicate a bin is for recycling in public settings, however, the color green may also be used in some regions, on some bins.

Recycling bins, cans, or wheeled carts (toters) are a common element of municipal kerbside collection programs, which frequently distribute the bins to encourage participation.

Gallery

See also

 Litter
 Recycling
 Index of recycling topics
 E-Cycling (recycling of electronic components)
 Plastic recycling
 Sustainability
Trash (computing)
 2000s commodities boom
 Waste sorting

References

Waste containers
Recycling

pl:Kubeł na śmieci#Segregowanie śmieci